Tak: The Great Juju Challenge is a platform video game developed by Avalanche Software and published by THQ for the GameCube, Game Boy Advance, Nintendo DS, PlayStation 2 and Xbox in 2005. It is the third title in the Tak series following Tak 2: The Staff of Dreams.

Plot
The game begins with Jibolba summoning the player (just like the original game) into the pig pen. He tells them that the Pupanunu Village is the host of The Great Juju Challenge, the first in 60 years. He then tells that Tak and Lok should be back by now. It then goes to Feathercrag, a location where Tak and Lok are looking for a Phoenix so they can get a feather to enter the challenge. After fighting Woodies and learning their powers, they finally catch up with the Phoenix, which is grabbed by two unknown men. However, Lok is able to grab a feather.

When they arrive to The Juju Realm for the challenges, the Moon Juju introduces the competitors. She introduces the four teams: Team Jibba Jabba, Team Grammazon, Team Pupanunu, and Team Black Mist (made up of two unknown men, Bartog and Crug). After they are dismissed, the Host Juju tells them what to do. After completing the first three challenges, the teams compete in a Proving Grounds match. After the match, Team Black Mist is eliminated. However, they return with the Two-Headed Juju who reveals that they messed up the scoring, and the Black Mist is back in.

Once again, they must go through three challenges, and then another Proving Grounds. Once again, Team Black Mist is eliminated. They once again return with Flora and Fauna who found Grammazon teeth in The Salt Lick of Performance Enhancement, so they are eliminated instead. Before the next match, Tak and Lok see Bartog and Crug talking to an unknown Juju, and planning. After three more challenges, the Proving Grounds match is played, but Team Jibba Jabba is eliminated. After the match Bartog and a different sounding Crug talk about burning down the Pupanunu Village, once they win. This means Tak and Lok must win.

On a return visit to The Gates of Nocturne, Tak and Lok find Crug, tied up. He reveals that they have been cheating with the Dark Juju, and the Juju and Bartog cut the weakest link, Crug. Crug knows a good way to do better than Team Black Mist. He tells them to go to Caster's Hill. Once there, Crug realizes that is not there. Next they go to Ambush Grove, where Tak and Lok find a collapsed Crug. He reveals that he defeated an invisible lizard to get The Ancient Hammer of Handy Juju, which he gives to Lok.

Finally, it comes down to two extremely hard challenges. After, Tak and Lok meet Bartog, "Crug", and the Moon Juju in the Proving Grounds. This is when the Dark Juju reveals himself, and announces his love for the Moon Juju. After three rounds, Tak and Lok win, and they keep the favor of the Moon Juju. When they return to the village, everyone is gone. But they have their own party, and end with a high-five.

Gameplay
The gameplay is an obstacle course with a timer counting down.  Tak and Lok try to reach the exit with the least time possible.  The score depends on the time, items collected and enemies defeated. The game can either be played one player who switches between Tak and Lok or by playing two player with a friend each controlling a character on a split screen.

Reception

The GameCube, Playstation 2 and Xbox versions received "generally favorable reviews", while the DS and Game Boy Advance versions received "mixed or average reviews", according to the review aggregation website Metacritic.

The game was nominated for Best Animated Video Game at the 33rd Annie Awards.

References

External links

 
 
 

2005 video games
3D platform games
Altron games
Avalanche Software games
Game Boy Advance games
GameCube games
Nintendo DS games
PlayStation 2 games
Tak and the Power of Juju
THQ games
Video game sequels
Xbox games
Video games developed in Japan
Multiplayer and single-player video games
WayForward games
Video games developed in the United States